ELCAT was a battery electric vehicle manufacturer and an electric vehicle importer based in Järvenpää, Finland.

Elcat Automotive was owned by an electricity producer called Fortum until the production decreases in the early 21st century. Elcat began working in 1974 to design electric cars for Nordic climate. The first prototypes for Elcat's automotive industry were made in 1985 with a joint venture plan with Subaru's Sambar, Dias, and Domingo vans, while the first commercial product was released in 1990. The users of Elcat vehicles were Finnish post office (Posti) and Stockholm-based delivery service.

Elcat ceased car production in 2002 and pivoted to importing electric vehicles. The company imported and sold electric quadricycles, golf carts, and maintenance vehicles as well as electric mopeds and bicycles.

Elcat went bankrupt in 2017.

Models
Cityvan, speed , distance 
Cityvan 200, speed , distance 
Cityvan 202, speed , distance 
Citywagon 202, speed , distance

References

External links

Elcat's website

Electric trucks
Car manufacturers of Finland
Defunct motor vehicle manufacturers of Finland
Defunct manufacturing companies of Finland